The 2008–09 season was the 90th in the Hércules CF's existence and the club's fourth consecutive season in the second division of Spanish football.

Players

First-team squad

Competitions

Overall record

Segunda División

League table

Results summary

Results by round

Matches

Copa del Rey

References

Hércules CF seasons
Hércules CF